, is an eccentric, stony asteroid, classified as near-Earth object and potentially hazardous asteroid. It belongs to the group of Apollo asteroids and measures approximately half a kilometer in diameter. It was discovered by American astronomer Jeff T. Alu at the U.S. Palomar Observatory, California, on 12 March 1988.

Classification and orbit 

The S-type asteroid orbits the Sun at a distance of 0.6–1.9 AU once every 1 years and 5 months (523 days). Its orbit has an eccentricity of 0.50 and an inclination of 3° with respect to the ecliptic.

In combination with its size, this makes it a potentially hazardous asteroid, which require an intersection distance with Earth of less than 0.05 AU, which is about 19.5 times the distance to the moon, and a diameter of at least 150 meters. On 27 February 2041, it will pass  from Earth. It also makes close approaches to Mars and Venus.

Physical characteristics

Lightcurve 

An ambiguous lightcurve was obtained through photometric observations by Czech astronomer Petr Pravec in 1998. The light-curve gave a rotation period of  hours with a brightness amplitude of 0.20 in magnitude. The alternative period solution is  hours with an amplitude of 0.22 in magnitude.

Diameter and albedo 

The Collaborative Asteroid Lightcurve Link (CALL) assumes a standard albedo for stony asteroids of 0.20 and calculates a diameter of 540 meters, based on an absolute magnitude of 18.7. Observations with the Spitzer Space Telescope using its Infrared Array Camera at wavelengths between 3.6 and 8.0 micrometers, gave an average diameter of 399 meters with a higher albedo of 0.37.

Notes

References

External links 
 Asteroid Lightcurve Database (LCDB), query form (info )
 Dictionary of Minor Planet Names, Google books
 Asteroids and comets rotation curves, CdR – Observatoire de Genève, Raoul Behrend
 
 
 

006037
006037
Discoveries by Jeff T. Alu
19880312